Fighting the Odds: The Marilyn Gambrell Story is a 2005 TV film which tells the true story of a former parole officer named Marilyn Gambrell, who helped a group of students at M.B. Smiley High School in Houston, Texas, United States. The students had either been raped, sexually harassed and/or beaten by their own parents.  Marilyn helped the students learn to fight back for one another and for themselves. For this, she created the No More Victims program.

The film aired on Lifetime. It starred Jami Gertz, Ernie Hudson, Eugene Clark and Sicily Sewell.

External links

 Fighting the Odds: The Marilyn Gambrell Story
 IMDB

2005 television films
2005 films
Lifetime (TV network) films
Films about rape
Films about sexual abuse
Biographical films about educators
High school films
2000s English-language films
2000s high school films